Kushal may refer to:
 Kushal, Iran, a village in Iran
 Kushal, an Indian given name, a variant of Kaushal; for list of people with the name, see 
 A phonetic transliteration of the Belarusian surname Kušal

See also 
 Khushal (disambiguation)